The Ford viscosity cup is a simple gravity device that permits the timed flow of a known volume of liquid passing through an orifice located at the bottom. Under ideal conditions, this rate of flow would be proportional to the kinematic viscosity (expressed in stokes and centistokes) that is dependent upon the specific gravity of the draining liquid. However, the conditions in a simple flow cup are seldom ideal for making true measurements of viscosity. It is important when using a Ford Cup and when retesting liquids that the temperature of the cup and the liquid is maintained, as ambient temperature makes a significant difference to viscosity and thus flow rate.

The original Ford Cup was based on Imperial (UK) measurement of the aperture.

Many other types of flow cups are being used, depending on the industry or region.

Din Cup 4 mm., standard DIN 53211 (cancelled)

ISO Cup 2, 3, 4, 5, 6, 8 mm. standard ISO 2431

AFNOR Cup 2,5, 4, 6, 8 mm. standard NF T30-014

ASTM Cup 1,2,3,4,5 standard ASTM D1200

See also
 Flow measurement
 Viscometer
 Zahn cup
 Din cup
 Afnor cup
 Flow cups

Notes and references

Fluid dynamics
Viscosity meters